İlker Avcıbay (born 1 October 1978) is a Turkish footballer who plays as a goalkeeper for Manisa Büyüksehir Belediyespor.

Club career
Avcıbay moved to Elazığspor in 2000. He has spent his entire career in Turkey, playing for Denizlispor, Altay, Antalyaspor, Adana Demirspor and Konyaspor. He joined Manisaspor on loan during the second half of the 2008-09 season, before making the move permanent at the end of the season.

In 2012, he joined Kasımpaşa, and was used mainly as a backup to Andreas Isaksson. Over the two years he was there, he made five appearances for the club; two in the Süper Lig and three in the Turkish Cup. In 2014, he joined Gaziantep Büyükşehir Belediyespor, and was appointed the club captain upon his arrival.

In August 2015, he joined Bayrampaşa SK then moved to Manisa FK in January 2016.

He retired on January 17, 2017.

References

External links

1978 births
Living people
Turkish footballers
Elazığspor footballers
Denizlispor footballers
Altay S.K. footballers
Antalyaspor footballers
Adana Demirspor footballers
Konyaspor footballers
Manisaspor footballers
Kasımpaşa S.K. footballers
Gaziantep F.K. footballers
Bayrampaşaspor footballers
Manisa FK footballers
Süper Lig players
Association football goalkeepers